Arne Berg (15 September 1931 – 25 January 2013) was a Norwegian ice hockey player

He was born in Bærum and represented the club Stabæk IF. He played for the Norwegian national ice hockey team, and  participated at the Winter Olympics in 1952, where the Norwegian team placed 9th.

References

External links

1931 births
2013 deaths
Sportspeople from Bærum
Ice hockey players at the 1952 Winter Olympics
Norwegian ice hockey players
Olympic ice hockey players of Norway